Protsenko is the name of:

 Andriy Protsenko (born 1988), Ukrainian high jumper
 Borys Protsenko (born 1978), Ukrainian ice hockey player
 Liudmyla Protsenko (1927-2000), Ukrainian historian
 Maria Protsenko (born 1946), Soviet architect
 Oleg Protsenko (born 1963), Russian triple jumper
 Vyacheslav Protsenko (born 1974), Ukrainian football player and coach

See also
 

Ukrainian-language surnames